The Glass Palace is a 2000 historical novel by Indian writer Amitav Ghosh. The novel is set in Burma, Bengal, India, and Malaya, spans a century from the Third Anglo-Burmese War and the consequent fall of the Konbaung Dynasty in Mandalay, through the Second World War to late 20th century. Through the stories of a small number of privileged families, it illuminates the struggles that have shaped Burma, India and Malaya into the places they are today. It explores the various facets of the colonial period, including the economic fall of Burma, the rise of timber and rubber plantations, the moral dilemmas faced by Indians in the British Indian Army, and the devastating effects of World War II. Focusing mainly on the early 20th Century, it explores a broad range of issues ranging from the changing economic landscape of Burma and India, to pertinent questions about what constitutes a nation and how these change as society is swept along by the tide of modernity.

The name of the novel derives from the Glass Palace Chronicle, which is an old Burmese historical work commissioned by King Bagyidaw in 1829.

Summary

Part One - Mandalay
The novel starts with an 11-year-old boy called Rajkumar running through the city of Mandalay to find a woman called Ma Cho. He is the last surviving member of his family and comes to Burma from India with a bright entrepreneurial spirit and a hunger for success.

Rajkumar's work as an assistant on Ma Cho's food stall takes place in the shadow of the Glass Palace, in which King Thibaw and his wife reside with their daughters, the princesses. As the Third Anglo-Burmese War breaks out, everyday citizens of Mandalay are able to enter the enshrined building, and it is then that Rajkumar spots Dolly, one of the princesses' attendants, and instantly falls in love with her. However, the entire Royal Family and their entourage are quickly extradited by the British and sent into house arrest thousands of miles away on the West coast of India.

Part Two - Ratnagiri 

Whilst Rajkumar's quickly evolving career begins to take shape with the help of Saya John, a successful teak merchant (Ma Cho's sometime lover), we are given a glimpse into the awkward beginnings of a new life for King Thebaw and his family as they try to settle into the port town of Ratnagiri, north of Goa. Events conspire to weave Outram House (the name of the residence the British provide to house the family and what remains of their assistants) more firmly into the life of Ratnagiri than had been expected. King Thebaw is revered by the local community, and in time the family come to feel secure and even happy in their new surroundings. The arrival of a new Collector stirs up feelings of resentment towards the colonial regime, but Uma, the Collector's headstrong wife, is able to help bridge the gap by befriending Dolly.

Meanwhile, Rajkumar has been enduring the hardships of the teak trade, having witnessed man and beast working together on an epic scale as elephants transport large volumes of wood down from the forests for sale into the British Empire's vastly expanding markets. Being the opportunist that he is, Rajkumar starts to make his own way in world after receiving advice from his new friend and colleague Doh Say. Borrowing cash from Saya John, he makes the journey to India to recruit poverty-stricken village-dwellers into the comparatively lucrative (yet undoubtedly perilous) world of early oil-mining in Burma. Having made enough money this way, Rajkumar does what has been his dream for some time: buy a timber-yard of his own, with Doh Say as business partner.

Having built a more than modest commercial empire, Rajkumar had one piece of unfinished business: to track down the only girl he'd ever loved, Dolly. Through an Indian connection in Rangoon (Yangon), Rajkumar makes contact with Ratnagiri via Uma, and is accordingly granted an audience with the Collector and his wife over a meal that of course stiffly conforms to colonial best practice. To his surprise, Dolly is present, and after some drama, he finally persuades her to leave the family she has been exiled with, and return with him to Burma as his wife.

Part Three - The Money Tree
Saya John prides himself on being able to spot the next big commodity, and on their return to Rangoon, he hands Rajkumar and Dolly a small clump of odd elastic material rubber ...

Part Four - The Wedding
A joining of multi-ethnic families in Calcutta.

Part Five - Morningside
Life before World War II on a rubber plantation in Malaya, run by Rajkumar with help of Saya John.

Part Six - The Front
The story of the Japanese invasion of Malaya and Burma and the subsequent family losses of lives and properties.

Part Seven - The Glass Palace
Post WWII lives of the scattered families.

Characters

Burmese Royal Family
Thibaw Min (the last king of the Konbaung kingdom of Burma who was exiled to Ratnagiri, India)
Supayalat (the last queen of Burma)
Hteiksu Myat Phaya Gyi
Hteiksu Myat Phaya Lat
Hteiksu Myat Phaya
Hteiksu Myat Phaya Galay

Rajkumar's Family
Rajkumar Raha (the central character, a Bengali orphan who finds himself in Burma)
Dolly Sein  (lady-in-waiting to Queen Supayalat, whom Rajkumar encounters as a child)
Neel Raha (Rajkumar and Dolly's elder son, who aspires to take over his father's business) 
Dinu Raha (Rajkumar and Dolly's younger son, an aspiring photographer) 
Jaya Raha (Neel and Manju's daughter)

Saya John's Family
Saya John Martins (Rajkumar's mentor, an entrepreneur in Burma and Malaya)
Matthew Martins (Saya John's son)
Elsa Hoffman (Matthew's American wife)
Alison Martins (Matthew and Elsa's daughter) 
Timmy Martins (Matthew and Elsa's son)

Uma Dey's Family
Beni Prasad Dey (District Collector at Ratnagiri)
Uma Dey (Collector Dey's wife)
Manju Roy (Uma's niece)
Arjun Roy (Uma's nephew, Manju's twin)
Bela Roy (Uma's younger niece)

Awards and translations
The Glass Palace was the Eurasian regional winner in the "Best Book" category of the 2001 Commonwealth Writers' Prize, but Amitav Ghosh was not aware that his publishers had submitted his book, and he withdrew it upon learning that he had won the regional round. It is also winner of Grand Prize for Fiction, Frankfurt eBook Award, 2001  and New York Times Notable Books of 2001.

The Glass Palace was translated and published into over 25 languages. It was also translated into Burmese by writer Nay Win Myint and published serialized at one of Burma's leading literary magazines Shwe Amyutay. Since the last part of novel is an extended elegy to Aung San Suu Kyi, Burmese Press Scrutiny Board asked for many cuts in the translation. The Burmese translation won the Myanmar National Literature Award in 2012.

References

2000 novels
2000 Indian novels
Indian historical novels in English
Indian National Army in fiction
Novels by Amitav Ghosh
Novels set in Myanmar
Novels set in British India
Novels set in the 19th century
Novels set in the 20th century